Francisco García (born 29 June 1998) is an Argentine professional footballer who plays as a midfielder for Ferro Carril Oeste.

Career
García began his senior career with Ferro Carril Oeste, having previously had youth spells with Escuela de Fútbol Yocsina, Belgrano and Club Renato Cesarini. Gustavo Coleoni promoted the midfielder into his first-team squad in December 2016, selecting him for his debut during a scoreless draw at home against Brown on 9 December.. He featured again in Primera B Nacional five days later as Ferro lost 4–1 to Guillermo Brown. García suffered a serious ligament injury at the end of 2017, leaving him out of action until August 2018. In May 2019, García signed his first professional contract with the club.

Career statistics
.

References

External links

1998 births
Living people
Footballers from Córdoba, Argentina
Argentine footballers
Association football midfielders
Primera Nacional players
Ferro Carril Oeste footballers